Grønlund is a surname. Notable people with the surname include:

 Frank Grønlund (born 1952), Norwegian footballer
 Svend Grønlund (1893–1977), Danish philatelist
 Mikkel Grønlund (born 1967),Publisher and owner of grønlunds

See also
 Gronlund, a surname
 Grönlund, a Finnish surname
 Grønlundfjellet, a village in the municipality of Gjerdrum, Norway
 Grønland (disambiguation)